The women's 200 metres at the 2022 World Athletics Championships was held at the Hayward Field in Eugene, Oregon, U.S. from 18 to 21 July 2022.

Summary

Coming into the championships, Shericka Jackson was the world leader at 21.55 from her Jamaican National Championships, making her the third fastest 200m runner ever.  Lined up to her inside was #2, the Olympic Champion Elaine Thompson-Herah.  Between them was the defending champion Dina Asher-Smith.  And to their outside, separated by #3 semi-finalist Tamara Clark was 100 metre champion Shelly-Ann Fraser-Pryce who had set the Masters World Record in the semis.  All 5 had run under 22 seconds just to get here.

Fraser-Pryce was first out of the blocks, which is her forté.  Asher-Smith was not too far behind and Jackson did not lose too much relative to the stagger.  Two thirds of the way through the turn, Fraser-Pryce had already passed Aminatou Seyni.  Almost a metre behind at the 80 metre mark on the track, as they exited the turn Jackson accelerated to even up with Fraser-Pryce.  From there she continued to pull away.  Asher-Smith tried to make some ground on Fraser-Pryce but only maintained the gap at the first half of the straightaway before Fraser-Pryce pulled away to a clear second place, three metres behind Jackson.  Asher-Smith's only challenge for bronze was a late run by Seyni, but she missed by a metre.

Jackson's 21.45 was the second fastest of all time, the Championship record, a .1 improvement over her Jamaican Championship time and only .11 shy of FloJo's enduring world record from 1988. Jackson also became the first person to win medals in all three sprinting events, a feat Fred Kerley was also attempting and failed to accomplish this year. In second, "Mommy Rocket" Fraser-Pryce's 21.81 took another .01 off the Masters record she had set the day earlier.

Records
Before the competition records were as follows:

Qualification standard
The standard to qualify automatically for entry was 22.80.

Schedule
The event schedule, in local time (UTC−7), was as follows:

Results

Heats 
The first 3 athletes in each heat (Q) and the next 6 fastest (q) qualify for the semi-finals.

Wind:Heat 1: +2.5 m/s, Heat 2: -0.2 m/s, Heat 3: +1.1 m/s, Heat 4: +0.4 m/s, Heat 5: +0.9 m/s, Heat 6: +1.9 m/s

Semi-finals 
The first 2 athletes in each heat (Q) and the next 2 fastest (q) qualify for the final.

Wind:Heat 1: +2.0 m/s, Heat 2: +1.4 m/s, Heat 3: -0.1 m/s

Final 
The final was started at 19:35 on 21 July. The results were as follows:

Wind: +0.6 m/s

References

200
200 metres at the World Athletics Championships